Mindbender(s) or The Mindbender(s) may refer to:

Film and television 
 The Mind Benders (1963 film), a British thriller film
 The Mind-Benders (1967 film), an American antidrug documentary film
 Mindbender (film), a 1995 film about Uri Geller by Ken Russell
 Mindbenders (film), a 2004 American science fiction film
 "Mindbender" (UFO), a 1971 television episode
 "Mindbender" (X-Men: Evolution), a 2002 television episode
 MindBender, a prize contest on the TV series Daily Planet

Literature 
 The Mindbenders (novel), a 1963 novel by James Kennaway
 The Mind Benders (book), a 1971 book by Cyril Vosper
 Mindbenders: Stories to Warp Your Brain, a 2000 story collection by Neal Shusterman

Music 
 The Mindbenders, a 1960s English beat group
 "Mind Bender", a song by Stillwater, 1977
 "Mind Bender", a song by Trouble from Simple Mind Condition, 2007
 "Mindbender (Confusion's Prince)", a song by the Grateful Dead from The Golden Road (1965–1973), 2001

Roller coasters 
 Mindbender (Galaxyland), a roller coaster in Edmonton, Alberta, Canada
 Mind Bender (Six Flags Over Georgia), a roller coaster near Atlanta, Georgia, U.S.

Other uses 
 Doctor Mindbender, a fictional character from the G.I. Joe universe
 Mindbender (video game), a 1989 MS-DOS computer game